General Abbott may refer to:

Frederick Abbott (Indian Army officer) (1805–1892), British Indian Army major general
Frederick Vaughan Abbott (1858–1928), U.S. Army brigadier general 
Henry Larcom Abbot (1831–1927), Union Army brevet brigadier general
Henry Livermore Abbott (1842–1864), Union Army posthumous brevet brigadier general
Herbert Edward Stacy Abbott (1814–1883), British Indian Army major general
James Abbott (Indian Army officer) (1807–1896), British Indian Army general
Oscar Bergstrom Abbott (1890–1969), U.S. Army brigadier general
Saunders Alexius Abbott (1811–1894), British Indian Army major general
Woodrow A. Abbott (1919−1994), U.S. Air Force brigadier general

See also
Attorney General Abbott (disambiguation)